Conus abruptus is an extinct species of sea snail, a marine gastropod mollusk in the family Conidae, the cone snails and their allies.

Description
Conus abruptus was originally discovered and described by New Zealand geologist Patrick Marshall in 1918.

Marshall's type description reads as follows:

Distribution
Pakaurangi Point, Kaipara Harbour, New Zealand, during the Tertiary.

References
This article incorporates public domain text originating from the New Zealand from the reference.

 Maxwell, P.A. (2009). Cenozoic Mollusca. pp 232–254 in Gordon, D.P. (ed.) New Zealand inventory of biodiversity. Volume one. Kingdom Animalia: Radiata, Lophotrochozoa, Deuterostomia. Canterbury University Press, Christchurch.

Further reading 
 Beu & Maxwell (1990). N.Z. Geol. Surv. Paleontol. Bull. 58: 124.

External links

abruptus
Prehistoric gastropods